Minister of the Interior is a prominent position in the Government of France. The position is equivalent to the interior minister in other countries, like the Home Secretary in the United Kingdom, the Minister of Public Safety in Canada, or similar to a combination of the Attorney General and the Secretary of Homeland Security in the United States.

Responsibilities 
The Minister of the Interior is responsible for the following:
 The general interior security of the country, with respect to criminal acts or natural catastrophes
 including the major law-enforcement forces
 the National Police
 the National Gendarmerie for its police operations since 2009; as a part of the French Armed Forces, the Gendarmerie is administratively under the purview of the Ministry of Armed Forces
 General directorate for civil defence and crisis management (Sécurité Civile)
 the directorate of Firefighters (Sapeurs-Pompiers)
 the granting of identity documents (passports, identity cards) and driving licenses through the network of prefectures and subprefectures
 relations between the central government and local governments
 logistics and organisation of political elections, at the national and prefectoral levels; the results of the elections are overseen by the Constitutional Council or the administrative courts
 regulation of immigration and preventing illegal immigration
 integration of legal immigrants (professionally, linguistically, housing)
 all regional and departmental prefects and subprefects are subordinate to the Minister of the Interior

The Minister of the Interior also takes on the role of the former Minister of Worship and is formally consulted in the process of appointment of Catholic diocesan bishops (Briand-Ceretti Agreement). The Minister of Worship used to be a fully-fledged position; the office was abolished in 1912.

While the Ministry of the Interior supervises police forces, it does not supervise criminal enquiries. Those enquiries are conducted under the supervision of the judiciary.

History
The Minister for the Maison du Roi under the Ancien Régime is considered to be the precursor of the position of Minister of the Interior, which was officially established on 7 August 1790, during the French Revolution, when François-Emmanuel Guignard, comte de Saint-Priest became the inaugural officeholder. Although his tasks included the organisation of elections, relations with local authorities, agriculture, as well as trade, the Minister of the Interior's main duty was to oversee the functioning of police forces. This has been the case since then, with the exception of the period from 1796 to 1818, when a Ministry of Police was in use, which was also briefly restored under the Second Empire.

During the First Empire, the Interior Ministry's tasks were reduced; in 1824, the Ministry of Public Instruction was established to oversee France's education policy. In 1832, the Interior Ministry was primarily occupied with the holding of elections and maintenance of the firefighters force, as the Institut de France and national public libraries were transferred to the Public Instruction Ministry. In 1836, the Ministry of Public Works, Agriculture and Commerce was established.

In 1911, the Directorate of Penitentiary Administration, established in 1858 in the Interior Ministry to oversee prison conditions, was placed under the authority of the Minister of Justice. Nine years later, the Interior Ministry lost its public health policy department to the newly established Ministry of Hygiene, Assistance and Social Security.

Location
The ministry's headquarters have been located on Place Beauvau, facing the Élysée Palace, since 1861. "Place Beauvau" is often used as a metonym for the ministry.

Organisation
The Minister of the Interior has been Gérald Darmanin since 6 July 2020. He succeeded Christophe Castaner, who was appointed to the office on 16 October 2018. Darmanin is assisted by Marlène Schiappa, who holds the junior title of Minister for Citizenship in the government of Prime Minister Jean Castex.

See also

 List of Interior Ministers of France

External links
 

 
Interior